Chunabhatti is a suburb of Mumbai and a part of Sion, Mumbai. It is located on the Eastern Express Highway. It is served by Chunabhatti railway station on the Harbour Line of the Mumbai Suburban Railway.

Chunabhatti (Chuna - lime, bhatti - kiln) is home to the first cotton mill in Mumbai, Swadeshi Mills, which was registered in 1886 by Jamsetji Tata. 
There were numerous lime kiln in Chunabhatti. Parshuram Soma Gaikar was one of the lime kiln owners.
Lime was used for construction and in cotton mills.

Chunabhatti surrounds the city's other areas such as Sion, Bandra, Wadala, Kurla, Chembur (AKP) and Ghatkopar.

Neharunagar bus depot is nearest to chunabhatti from where all over maharashtra traveling can be done through Maharashtra ST bus service

Two public playgrounds are located in chunabhatti. Shree Chhatrapati Shivaji Maharaj Ground ( near to chunabhatti railway station ) & Muktadevi Manoranjan Udyan ( near hill road , opposite of Veravali building ). One more ground is located near to railway station also known as small somaiya ground. One  Brihanmumbai Mahanagar Palika Garden located exactly opposite to Shree Chhatrapati Shivaji Maharaj Ground which is good for kids and older people especially.

Maasaheb Minatai Thakre Maternity Hospital ( Govt. Hospital ) is located on VN Purav Marg ( Main road ). Also some private hospitals are available in chunabhatti ( Dalvi Nursing Home , Santrupti Hospital , Prathamesh Hospital )

One BMC school is there in chunabhatti ( Chunabhatti Municipal Primary / Secondary High School. Also private schools are there ( L.K.High School , Vidyavikas High School , Kedarnath High School )

Education 
Chunabhatti boasts of good quality technical training institutes that are certified by the Government of India. 
The premier institutes here are, namely, 

1. ATI (Advanced Training Institute)

2. IDEMI (Institute for Design of Electrical Measuring Instruments)
3. Central Labour Institute
4. Manohar Phalke Polytechnic Mumbai
5. Padmabhushan Vasantdada Patil Pratishthan's College of Engineering
6. KJ Somaiya Medical College And Research Centre
7. K. J. Somaiya Institute of Engineering and Information Technology

References

Suburbs of Mumbai